Willem van den Bundel (1575–1655), was a Dutch Golden Age painter.

Biography
He was born in Brussels and became a landscape painter, possibly as the pupil of Gillis van Coninxloo who was a witness at his wedding  in Delft in 1600. He moved to Amsterdam 1607–1620 but was back in Delft as a paying member of the Guild of St. Luke during the years 1623–1654. His son died in Delft in 1642 and he sold works in Leiden 1644–1645.

He died in Delft.

References

 
Willem van den Bundel on Artnet

1575 births
1655 deaths
Dutch Golden Age painters
Dutch male painters
Artists from Brussels
Painters from Delft
Landscape painters